The Original Hotcake House is a diner in Portland, Oregon's Brooklyn neighborhood, in the United States. In his 2018 overview of late-night, low-budget food in Portland, Michael Russell of The Oregonian wrote, "If you’ve never crashed down in front of a plate of pancakes and fried eggs at the Original Hotcake House after a night out, you might not have lived in Portland long enough." The restaurant offers 24/7 service except on Thanksgiving and Christmas.

See also
 List of diners

References

External links

 

Brooklyn, Portland, Oregon
Diners in Portland, Oregon
Year of establishment missing